Carey House, also known as the Eaton Hotel, is a historic building  completed in 1887 in Wichita, Kansas. It was built by businessman and mayor John B. Carey and has a tower at its northeast corner. It is listed on the National Register of Historic Places.

The building was designed by the firm Terry & Dumont (Charles W. Terry and Elbert Dumont). It is at 525 East Douglas Avenue in the heart of Carey House Square District, a contiguous block of late 19th and early 20th century buildings. The 5-story building is an example of eclectic architecture.

Terry & Dumont are also credited with designing the Bitting Building in Wichita and Dumont with the H.F. Smith House at 721 W. Harvey Avenue in Wellington, Kansas, both properties NRHP listed.

See also
National Register of Historic Places listings in Sedgwick County, Kansas

References

National Register of Historic Places in Wichita, Kansas
Hotel buildings on the National Register of Historic Places in Kansas
Buildings and structures in Wichita, Kansas
Victorian architecture in Kansas
Hotel buildings completed in 1887